Michael G. Burton is an astronomer who is director of the Armagh Observatory and Planetarium. He was previously director of teaching at the School of Physics, University of New South Wales. He is a member of the International Astronomical Union.

Burton is a fellow of Astronomical Society of Australia (FASA), Australian Institute of Physics (FAIP), and the Royal Society of New South Wales (FRSN).

References 

Living people
Academic staff of the University of New South Wales
Year of birth missing (living people)
Astronomers from Northern Ireland
Fellows of the Australian Institute of Physics
Fellows of the Royal Society of New South Wales